The Return is a 2013 Venezuelan film directed by Patricia Ortega. The first Zulian film of this millennium, it premiered on 30 August 2013 in commercial cinemas in Venezuela.

Plot
An armed group breaks the tranquility of the inhabitants of Bahía Portete in the Colombian Alta Guajira. In the midst of the horror and blood, women risk their lives to help their children escape. Shüliwala, a girl of only 10, manages to flee to a border city. But once she is in this strange territory, she must manage to survive and not lose hope of returning home.

Cast

Filming

Locations in the city of Marabina served as the setting for the film, including Las Pulgas market, Las Playitas Shopping Center, La Cañada Morillo, El Callejón de Los Pobres, and the surroundings of Plaza Bolívar.

Theme and influences
The film is based on the real events of the Bahía Portete massacre, which took place in the Colombian Guajira on 16 April 2004. A paramilitary group broke into a Wayuu camp, killing people. Some bodies were found and others disappeared. It caused the involuntary displacement of some 600 people who took refuge in Zulia, Venezuela.

"It was decided to make a fiction film to protect the identity of those affected who are still struggling to recover their territory," clarified Patricia Ortega, and added that the beginning of the story of El Regreso is based on those events.

The Return shows part of the Wayuu culture during the beginning of the film. Later, during the ending, the main character takes over the screen with the experiences of the transition between flight, survival, and the journey back home. More than 70% of the language used in the film is indigenous Wayuu.

Awards and nominations

References

External links
 
 
 The Return at FilmAffinity 

2013 drama films
2013 films
Drama films based on actual events
2010s Spanish-language films
Venezuelan drama films
Wayuu-language films